Air Link International Aviation College, also referred to by its acronym ALIAC or simply as Air Link, is a private, aviation-oriented educational institution located at the General Aviation Area of the Domestic Airport in Pasay, Metro Manila, Philippines.

The main campus features 28 aircraft, single and twin-engined, and a hangar next to a classroom building. Another campus, located on the island of Lubang, Occidental Mindoro, provides facilities for intensive training for both flying and ground students.

History 
ALIAC was founded in 1982 by Captain Geronimo Amurao, a Philippine Airlines pilot, when he established a small flying school which he called the "Amurao Flying School". In 1984, this small aviation school grew to become the "Air Link International Aviation School" under the stewardship of Capt. Amurao, with the help of his wife, Dr. Myrna Tan Vallecer-Amurao. In April 2003, its name was amended to "Air Link International Aviation College". In 2017, Atty. Gomeriano V. Amurao became the new Managing Chairman and President of ALIAC.

Academic programs 
The Commission on Higher Education (CHED) and the Technical Education and Skills Development Authority (TESDA) recognize ALIAC's academic programs. The Civil Aviation Authority of the Philippines (CAAP) certifies that ALIAC is an Approve Training Organization for Flight Training and Aircraft Maintenance. Aircraft frames and power plants are available for ALIAC students to work on, dismantle and assemble in the laboratories under the direct supervision of duly licensed personnel.

References 

Universities and colleges in Metro Manila
Education in Pasay
Educational institutions established in 1984
Aviation schools in the Philippines
Air_Link_International_Aviation_College_(Philippines)